Twitty is an unincorporated community in Wheeler County, Texas, United States. It was named after an early settler Asa Twitty.

It may have been the origin of the stage name of the country singer Conway Twitty. In fact, on the March 30, 1989, episode of Late Night with David Letterman, Conway Twitty admitted that he chose his stage last name after seeing Twitty, Texas, on a map.

References

Unincorporated communities in Wheeler County, Texas
Unincorporated communities in Texas